This is a list of the 177 resident embassies in Washington, D.C. For other diplomatic missions in the United States, see List of diplomatic missions in the United States.

The embassy of Iran closed in 1979. It was located at 3005 Massachusetts Avenue NW in Embassy Row. The building continues to be owned by the government of Iran but is maintained by the US Department of State while the Iranian interests section is located in the Pakistani Embassy.

See also
Ambassadors of the United States
Diplomatic missions of the United States
Foreign policy of the United States
List of diplomatic missions in the United States
Taipei Economic and Cultural Representative Office in the United States
Hong Kong Economic and Trade Office
Former Embassy of Iran in Washington, D.C.

References

External links
Foreign Embassies and consulates in Washington, D.C.
U.S. State Department Diplomatic List
Foreign Affairs: DC’s Best Embassies
Google Maps listing of all Embassies in Washington, D.C.
Where Can You Have an Embassy in D.C.? - Ghosts of DC blog

 
United States
Diplomatic